Krušinec is a village and municipality in Stropkov District in the 'Prešov Region of north-eastern Slovakia.

History
In historical records the village was first mentioned in 1543.

Geography
The municipality lies at an altitude of 212 metres and covers an area of 2.617 km². It has a population of about 254 people.

External links
 
 
https://web.archive.org/web/20070513023228/http://www.statistics.sk/mosmis/eng/run.html

Villages and municipalities in Stropkov District
Šariš